Liubal Colás (born 9 January 1974) is a Cuban wrestler. He competed in the men's Greco-Roman 68 kg at the 1996 Summer Olympics.

References

1974 births
Living people
Cuban male sport wrestlers
Olympic wrestlers of Cuba
Wrestlers at the 1996 Summer Olympics
Sportspeople from Santiago de Cuba
Pan American Games medalists in wrestling
Pan American Games gold medalists for Cuba
Wrestlers at the 1995 Pan American Games
Wrestlers at the 1999 Pan American Games
20th-century Cuban people
21st-century Cuban people